Lily of the valley (Convallaria majalis, sometimes written lily-of-the-valley, is a woodland flowering plant with sweetly scented, pendent, bell-shaped white flowers borne in sprays in spring. It is native throughout the cool temperate Northern Hemisphere in Asia and Europe. Convallaria majalis var. montana, also known as the American lily of the valley, is native to North America.

Due to the concentration of cardiac glycosides (cardenolides), it is highly poisonous if consumed by humans or other animals.

Other names include May bells, Our Lady's tears, and Mary's tears. Its French name, muguet, sometimes appears in the names of perfumes imitating the flower's scent. In pre-modern England, the plant was known as glovewort (as it was a wort used to create a salve for sore hands), or Apollinaris (according to a legend that it was discovered by Apollo).

Description

Convallaria majalis is an herbaceous perennial plant that often forms extensive colonies by spreading underground stems called rhizomes. New upright shoots are formed at the ends of stolons in summer, these upright dormant stems are often called pips. These grow in the spring into new leafy shoots that still remain connected to the other shoots under ground.

The flowers have six white tepals (rarely pink), fused at the base to form a bell shape,  diameter, and sweetly scented; flowering is in late spring, in mild winters in the Northern Hemisphere it is in early March. Plants are self-incompatible, and colonies consisting of a single clone do not set seed.

Taxonomy
In the APG III system, the genus is placed in the family Asparagaceae, subfamily Nolinoideae (formerly the family Ruscaceae). It was formerly placed in its own family Convallariaceae, and, like many lilioid monocots, before that in the lily family Liliaceae.

There are three varieties that have sometimes been separated out as distinct species or subspecies by some botanists.

Convallaria majalis var. keiskei – from China and Japan, with red fruit and bowl-shaped flowers (now widely cited as Convallaria keiskei)
C. majalis var. majalis – from Eurasia, with white midribs on the flowers
C. majalis var. montana – from the United States, maybe  with green-tinted midribs on the flowers

Convallaria transcaucasica is recognised as a distinct species by some authorities, while the species formerly called Convallaria japonica is now classified as Ophiopogon japonicus.

Distribution
Convallaria majalis is a native of Europe, where it largely avoids the Mediterranean and Atlantic margins. An eastern variety, C. majalis var. keiskei occurs in Japan and parts of eastern Asia. A limited native population of C. majalis var. montana (synonym C. majuscula) occurs in the Eastern United States. There is, however, some debate as to the native status of the American variety.

Like many perennial flowering plants, C. majalis exhibits dual reproductive modes by producing offspring asexually by vegetative means and by seed, produced via the fusion of gametes.

Ecology
Convallaria majalis is a plant of partial shade, and mesophile type that prefers warm summers. It likes soils that are silty or sandy and acid to moderately alkaline, with preferably a plentiful amount of humus. The Royal Horticultural Society states that slightly alkaline soils are the most favored. It is a Euroasiatic and suboceanic species that lives in mountains up to  elevation.

Convallaria majalis is used as a food plant by the larvae of some moth and butterfly (Lepidoptera) species including the grey chi. Adults and larvae of the leaf beetle Lilioceris merdigera are also able to tolerate the cardenolides and thus feed on the leaves.

Cultivation

Convallaria majalis is widely grown in gardens for its scented flowers and ground-covering abilities in shady locations. It has gained the Royal Horticultural Society's Award of Garden Merit. In favourable conditions it can form large colonies.

Various kinds and cultivars are grown, including those with double flowers, rose-colored flowers, variegated foliage and ones that grow larger than the typical species.

C. majalis 'Albostriata' has white-striped leaves
C. majalis 'Green Tapestry', 'Haldon Grange', 'Hardwick Hall', 'Hofheim', 'Marcel', 'Variegata' and 'Vic Pawlowski's Gold' are other variegated cultivars
C. majalis 'Berlin Giant' and C. majalis 'Géant de Fortin' (syn. 'Fortin's Giant') are larger-growing cultivars
C. majalis 'Flore Pleno' has double flowers.
C. majalis 'Rosea' sometimes found under the name C. majalis var. rosea, has pink flowers.

Traditionally Convallaria majalis has been grown in pots and winter forced to provide flowers during the winter months, both for as potted plants and as cut flowers.

Chemistry
Roughly 38 different cardiac glycosides (cardenolides) – which are highly toxic if consumed by humans or animals – occur in the plant, including:

The odor of lily of the valley, specifically the ligand bourgeonal, was thought to attract mammalian sperm. The 2003 discovery of this phenomenon prompted research into odor reception, but a 2012 study demonstrated instead that at high concentrations, bourgeonal imitated the role of progesterone in stimulating sperm to swim (chemotaxis), a process unrelated to odor reception.

Toxicology
All parts of the plant are potentially poisonous, including the red berries which may be attractive to children. If ingested, the plant can cause abdominal pain, nausea, vomiting, and irregular heartbeats.

Uses

Perfume
In 1956, the French firm Dior produced a fragrance simulating lily of the valley, which was Christian Dior's favorite flower. Diorissimo was designed by Edmond Roudnitska. Although it has since been reformulated, it is considered a classic. Because no natural aromatic extract can be produced from lily of the valley, its scent must be recreated synthetically; while Diorissimo originally achieved this with hydroxycitronellal, the European Chemicals Agency now considers it a skin sensitizer and its use has been restricted.

Other perfumes imitating or based on the flower include Henri Robert's Muguet de Bois (1936), Penhaligon's Lily of the Valley (1976), and Olivia Giacobetti's En Passant (2000).

Weddings and other celebrations

Lily of the valley has been used in weddings and off-season can be very expensive. Lily of the valley was featured in the bridal bouquet at the wedding of Prince William and Catherine Middleton. Lily of the valley was also the flower chosen by Princess Grace of Monaco to be featured in her bridal bouquet.

At the beginning of the 20th century, it became tradition in France to sell lily of the valley on international Labour Day, 1 May (also called La Fête du Muguet (Lily of the Valley Day) by labour organisations and private persons without paying sales tax (on that day only) as a symbol of spring.

Lily of the valley is worn in Helston (Cornwall, UK) on Flora Day (8 May each year, see Furry Dance) representing the coming of "the May-o" and the summer. There is also a song sung in pubs around Cornwall (and on Flora Day in Cadgwith, near Helston) called "Lily of the Valley"; the song, strangely, came from the Jubilee Singers from Fisk University in Nashville, Tennessee.

Folk medicine
The plant has been used in folk medicine for centuries. There is a reference to "Lilly of the valley water" in Robert Louis Stevenson's novel Kidnapped where it is said to be "good against the Gout", and that it "comforts the heart and strengthens the memory" and "restores speech to those that have the dumb palsey". There is no scientific evidence that lily of the valley has any effective medicinal uses for treating human diseases.

Cultural symbolism
The lily of the valley was the national flower of Yugoslavia, and it also became the national flower of Finland in 1967.

In the "language of flowers", the lily of the valley signifies the return of happiness.

Myths
The name "lily of the valley", like its correspondences in some other European languages, is apparently a reference to the phrase "lily of the valleys" (sometimes also translated as "lily of the valley") in Song of Songs 2:1. European herbalists' use of the phrase to refer to a specific plant species seems to have appeared relatively late in the 16th or 15th century. The New Latin term convallaria (coined by Carl Linnaeus) and, for example, Swedish name  derives from the corresponding phrase lilium convallium in the Vulgate.

In culture
 It is widely represented in decorative arts.
 The flower is the theme of the titular poem by Paul Laurence Dunbar.
 Tchaikovsky wrote the poem "Lilies of the Valley" (Ландыши) in December 1878 while in Florence. 
 In Anton Chekhov's "A Doctor's Visit" drops of convallaria are mentioned as medicine. 
 "Lilies of the Valley" is a 1916 Marc Chagall painting.
 The 46th episode of the television series Breaking Bad showcases the lily of the valley's use as a poison.
 In 2022 the lily of the valley, as reputedly Queen Elizabeth II's favourite flower, was the theme of a poem "Floral Tribute" by the poet laureate, Simon Armitage, written in memory of the Queen and published in the week after her death.

Gallery

See also
 List of plants known as lily

References

External links

Invasive Plant Atlas – US Distribution Map
Convallaria majalis fact sheet – NC Cooperative Extension

Flora of Europe
Flora of temperate Asia
Flora of the Southeastern United States
Flora of Myanmar
Flora of West Virginia
Garden plants of Asia
Garden plants of Europe
Garden plants of North America
Medicinal plants
Nolinoideae
Plants described in 1753
Poisonous plants